A number of mountains in the British Isles have the name Cairn Hill

 Cairn Hill (Antarctica)
 Cairn Hill, Northumberland, one of the Cheviot Hills, England
 Carn Clonhugh in County Longford, Ireland which is also known as Cairn/Corn Hill
 Cairn Hill transmission site radio and television transmission
 Cairn Hill, Scotland, Scotland, see Cairnryan#History

Other uses
 Cairn Hill mine, an iron ore mine in Australia